Parectopa dactylota is a moth of the family Gracillariidae. It is known from Ecuador and Peru.

References

Gracillariinae